The Hebei University of Technology (HEBUT) is a provincial public university in Tianjin, China. The university is now sponsored by Hebei Province, Tianjin Municipality, and the Ministry of Education. It is a member of the Double First Class University Plan and the former Project 211.

The university has around 23,000 undergraduate students and 7,500 postgraduate students. There is 1,940 academic staff members at the university.

History 

The institution was established by Yuan Shikai, receiving a royal charter in 1903 as Peiyang Technological School, from Guangxu Emperor. Zhou Xuexi was the university's first president (Chinese: 总办). The university modeled itself on the famous European and American institutions of higher learning and aimed to rejuvenate China by training qualified personnel with new scientific and technological knowledge. In 1958, after restructuring, institution was renamed Hebei institution of Technology. In 1995, institution was renamed Hebei University of Technology.

Timeline 
1903–1949

1903: Founded with the name Beiyang Technical School.

1904: Renamed as Zhili Higher School of Technology.

1929: Renamed as Hebei Provincial Technological Institute.

1946: Renamed as Hebei Provincial Institute of Technology.
 
1949–1993

1950: Renamed as Hebei Institute of Technology.

1951: Merged with Beiyang University as Tianjin University.

1958: Re-established as Hebei Institute of Technology.

1962: Integrated with Tianjin Mechanical and Electrical Engineering Institute, Tianjin Institute of Chemical Technology as well as Tianjin Construction and Engineering Institute into Tianjin Institute of Technology.

1971: Restored with the name Hebei Institute of Technology.

1994–present

1995: Renamed the Hebei University of Technology.

1996: Enlisted as one of the first key universities in the former national “Project 211". Successfully completed the three stages of construction.

Campuses 
HEBUT's main campus is located in Tianjin, China. The different campus areas are named as follows; Beichen campus, Hongqiao South Campus, Hongqiao East Campus. The campuses themselves contain many amenities and student housing.

The university has a teaching and research equipment is worth 372 million RMB, and there are 1.88 million books in the university library located on the Beichen campus.

HEBUT is also partnered with Lappeenranta-Lahti University of Technology LUT in Finland to host english bachelor's programs on two different campuses in Finland. These campuses are located in the cities of Lappeenranta and Lahti, Finland.

Programs 
HEBUT offers 69 undergraduate bachelor's programs, in addition to master's and doctoral programs. Programs are generally taught in Chinese in fields of engineering, design, and business, and there is also a non-degree program lasting 1 semester consisting of Chinese Language. The university also offers programs in Chinese law and politics.

Internationalization 
HEBUT has been committed to international cooperation and attaches importance to the development, quality improvement and brand building of educational exchanges. It was qualified by a Chinese government project to award international student scholarships. At present, HEBUT has generated international exchange programs with universities in more than 60 countries and regions including France, the United States, Germany, Russia, Italy, Australia, Great Britain, Finland, Japan, Hong Kong and Taiwan. Over 20 exchange programs are being carried out, which so far have received 500 international students for non-degree education and sent more than 800 students abroad.

Faculty 
HEBUT emploees 2474 faculty members. Among them 1365 full-time teachers, 706 of which hold senior professional titles, as well as 682 teachers with doctorate degrees. HEBUT operates  team of national technology expertise, 3 state-level teaching teams, 2 innovative research teams with the Ministry of Education, as well as 5 provincial teaching teams.

Research 
HEBUT commits to research with 17 different providential institutes, as well as a laboratory and engineering research center. 

After the establishment of the Hebei University of Technology National Defense and Science Institute, the university obtained a qualification to perform military research.

HEBUT is open to research from the government of the PRC, as well as private corporations who are looking to do product and theoretical research.

Notable Peoples

Alumni 
Translator, Huang Ai
Chairman of the People's Political Consultative Conference of China, Jia Qinglin

Faculty 
Artist and art teacher, Li Shutong

References

External links

English Version of official website
University Guancanghai BBS

 
Universities and colleges in Tianjin
 
Project 211
Educational institutions established in 1903
1903 establishments in China